Masjid Al-Mawaddah (Jawi:مسجد المودة) is a mosque located in Sengkang, Singapore. It was opened on 21 May 2009.

History
The mosque was built under the Phase 4 of the Mosque Building Fund programme to cater to the large demographic of young families in the Buangkok and Sengkang area and cost $10.5 million to build. The mosque's name, given by the Majlis Ugama Islam Singapura is derived from the Arabic word, مودة,  which literally means affectionate. The name was taken from the Quran Surah Ar-Rum verse 21:

"And among His Signs is this, that He created for you mates from among yourselves, that ye may dwell In tranquillity with them, and He has put  and Mercy between your (hearts): Verily In that are Signs for those who reflect."

Aside from its numerous family friendly features for the young and the old, it also boasts a number of environmentally friendly features that are energy-conserving. Due to this mosque has attained the Greenmark Certification (2009 & 2011) from the Building and Construction Authority.

The mosque's capacity is increased to 4,000 worshipers during peak periods.

Controversy
On 13 October 2017, Berita Harian, Singapore's Malay newspaper, published an article How to deal with stubborn wives (translated title) by Ustaz Mohammad Zaid Isahak, the executive Imam of the Al-Mawaddah Mosque. 

The religious scholar had responded to a question on an advice column on whether a husband could "distance himself from a wife who refuses to obey him". Ustaz Zaid said that husbands should try gentle persuasion to remind their wives of their obligations their husbands, if their advice is unheeded,  husbands can then leave or ignore his wife for a short period of time. The column article suggests that if such measures do not work, it is permissible under Islamic law to hit a wife, as long as it is not on the face, leaves no visible marks on her body, and that the husband is certain that the act of hitting a wife will change her disobedience. 

The article sparked an outcry on social media and prompted a response from Marine Parade Group Representation Constituency's Member of Parliament, Faishal Ibrahim, and head of the Office of the Mufti, Ustaz Irwan Hadi, denouncing spousal violence of any form. Berita Harian posted clarifications from Ustaz Zaid later, saying the Quranic verse he had cited was not an excuse for a husband to physically punish or insult his wife, and it should be interpreted in the modern context".

Transportation
The mosque is accessible from Buangkok MRT station.

References

2009 establishments in Singapore
Buildings and structures in Sengkang
Mosques completed in 2009
Mawaddah